Esthlogena comata is a species of beetle in the family Cerambycidae. It was described by James Thomson in 1857. It is known from Uruguay and Brazil.

References

Pteropliini
Beetles described in 1857